Glaucocharis setacea is a moth in the family Crambidae. It was described by Tie-Mei Chen, Shi-Mei Song and De-Cheng Yuan in 2003. It is found in Hubei, China.

References

Diptychophorini
Moths described in 2003